Agia Kyriaki (Agía Kyriakí) is a small Greek island less than one mile from Astypalaia in the Dodecanese islands.

On the island is the small church of Agia (Saint) Kyriaki. Every July the people of Leros will go to the small island to celebrate the name day of the saint. The island is an ideal place for fishing and diving.

Chapel of Agia Kyriaki
Legend has it that a fisherman who used to go on the island often to collect salt kept falling on a piece of wood. He would pick it up and throw it into the sea, but the next time he was on the island there it was again. The third time, annoyed as he was, he took a good look at it and saw that it was in fact an icon of Saint Kyriaki. He decided to build a church on the same spot where he found the icon.

Dodecanese
Uninhabited islands of Greece
Landforms of Kalymnos (regional unit)
Islands of the South Aegean
Islands of Greece